Bodyslam is a Thai rock band. The band is best known by the unique voice of the leading vocalist, Athiwara "Toon" Khongmalai, and the band's live performances.

History
Bodyslam was originally called La - On which means kids or younger people, inspired by the name of freshman orientations at Suankularb Wittayalai School, the elementary school the band (the initial "La-on")'s members attended. In 1996, the band entered a band competition for high school students called 'Hot Wave Music Awards' and won the first prize, beating nearly a hundred other bands. La-on quickly signed a record deal with record company Music Bugs, and released a self-titled pop-rock album in 1997. "Dai Rue Plao" (ได้หรือเปล่า) became their most recognized song. The band members portrayed roles of themselves in the lakorn (Thai TV series) Thep Niyai Nai Sano (เทพนิยายนายเสนาะ) and later released the series' soundtrack in that same year.

The band returned in 2002 under the new name Bodyslam, shifting to heavier rock music with only three of the original six members remaining. The first self-titled album under their new name as a three-piece band was successful. The second album, Drive, was released in 2003, becoming equally successful as their previous album. They won Channel [V] Thailand Music Video Awards for "Favorite Group" for the music video Plai Thang (ปลายทาง: End of the road).

After the second album, the band went through many changes. They left Music Bugs and later signed a deal with Genie Records, a subsidiary of GMM Grammy, Thailand's largest record company. The band's guitarist Ratthapol "Pao" Pannachet left the band for a solo career (with an album in November 2005). Bodyslam then became a four-piece band. Bodyslam's long-time touring drummer, Chad, was finally announced as an official member and had appeared in music videos, posters, and album covers. The fourth member was Thanachai "Yod" Tantrakul, the new guitarist who was brought in to replace Ratthapol.

On 15 September 2007, Bodyslam released their fourth album Save My Life and a major concert in Bangkok followed in early October of that same year.

The success of the new album had brought them a bigger fan base. They became one of the most popular bands in Thailand. Save My Life won Season Awards for "Best Rock Group", "Best Rock Album" and "Best Rock Song" for "Yahpid" (ยาพิษ: Poison) in March 2008.

The single "Kraam" (คราม: Indigo) was released in November 2009 in which the fifth studio album with the same name (Kraam) was released in the spring of 2010 (After late to June 2010 with 2010 Thai political protests). They performed the largest concert in Thailand called Bodyslam Live in Kraam, at Rajamangala National Stadium on November 27, 2010 with an audience of 65,000 people. They finished their tour on April 7, 2011 with the Bodyslam Live in Laos: World Tour at New Laos National Stadium.

Their sixth album, "Dharmajāti" (meaning "nature" in Sanskrit), was released on September 25, 2014. Dharmajāti won "Best Album", the song "Chee-Wit Yung Kong Suay Ngarm" won "Best Recording" while the producer of the album, Poonsak Jaturaboon of Big Ass, won Producer of the Year in 26th Season Awards.

In May 2015 Bodyslam had a concert "100 Plus presents Bodyslam 13 years Concert". It was an anniversary concert that had many songs from every album. The concert for 13 years of Bodyslam. This concert had an audience of about 30,000 at Impact Arena Lakeside by Kala (group of producer). The concert had other singers, "Pu" Anchalee on the song "Ruk Yoo Kang Ter" (รักอยู่ข้างเธอ : Love Beside You) featuring Anchalee Jongkadeekij, Moderndog (music band), Labanoon on the song "Plid Plew" (ปลิดปลิว : Blown Away) featuring Methee Arun from Labanoon and the member from Big Ass, Siriporn Aumpripong on the song "Kit Hord" (คิดฮอด : Miss you) featuring Siriporn Ampaipong and "Goft" Fucking Hero - "Aui" Buddabas on song "Sticker", They showed a new song from the album "Dharmajāti"  and famous songs from old albums, for example "Taang Kong Chun Fhun Kong Ter" (ทางของฉัน ฝันของเธอ : My path, your dream) from the album "Bodyslam",   "Kwaam Sue-Sat" (ความซื่อสัตย์ : Honestly) from the album "Drive" , "Korb Fah" (ขอบฟ้า Edge of the sky) from the album "Believe" , "Yar Pid" (ยาพิษ Poison) from the album "Save My Life" and "Kraam" (คราม Indigo) from the album Kraam. The performance time was around 4 hours.

In 2015 Bodyslam was given the award, Seed award of the year (Rock) from Seed Radio, and they showed a concert with Carabao band (famous music band in Thailand). On 19 July 2015, Bodyslam released a new single "Wala Tao Nun" ( เวลาเท่านั้น Time Only) meaning "everything will have the answer by time".

Line-ups
Current members
 Artiwara "Toon" Kongmalai – lead vocals
 Thanachai "Yod" Tantrakul – guitar (starting from third album Believe)
 Tanadol "Pid" Changsawek – bass guitar
 Suchatti "Chad" Janed – drum (starting from third album Believe)
 Ohm "Ohm" Plengkhum – keyboards (starting from fifth album Kraam)
Former members
 Ratthapol "Pao" Pannachet – guitar (First and second album)

Discography
 Bodyslam (2002)
 Drive (2003)
 Believe (2005)
 Save My Life (2007)
 Kraam (2010)
 Dharmajāti (2014)
 Wi-Cha Tua Bao (2019)

Concerts
 17 April 2004, Hotwave Live : Bodyslam Maximum Live Concert. At "Main Hall", Thammasat University.
 14 May 2005, Bodyslam Believe Concert. At "Thunder Dome", Muang Thong Thani.
 9 October 2005, Big Body Concert With Big Ass. At "Impact Arena", Muang Thong Thani.
 20 – 21 October 2007, Bodyslam Save My Life Concert. At Indoor Stadium, Huamark.
 5 July 2008, Every Bodyslam Concert. At Impact Arena, Muang Thong Thani
 27 November 2010, Soda Chang present "Bodyslam Live in Kraam by Air Asia". At Rajamangala Stadium, Huamark.
 10 – 12 February 2012, Bodyslam Nang Len. At "Impact Exhibition Hall 1", Muang Thong Thani.
 October 2014 - November 2014, Pra Got Garn Dharmajāti.
 31 May 2015, Bodyslam 13. At "Impact Lakeside", Muangthong Thani.
 October 2016, The Grandslam Live Bodyslam With The Orchestra at GMM Livehouse, CentralWorld
 9-10 February 2019, BODYSLAM FEST Wi-Cha Tua Bao LIVE IN Rajamangala Stadium (Thai: BODYSLAM FEST วิชาตัวเบา LIVE IN ราชมังคลากีฬาสถาน) at Rajamangala Stadium

Songs
Bodyslam has released over 70 songs, with the album count at 7.

References

External links
 Official Site
 All Bodyslam songs
 eotoday.com Bodyslam profile (Thai)

Thai rock music groups
Post-hardcore groups
Pop punk groups
Musical groups from Bangkok
Musical groups established in 2002